The Tenth Menzies ministry (Liberal–Country Coalition) was the 40th ministry of the Government of Australia. It was led by the country's 12th Prime Minister, Sir Robert Menzies. The Tenth Menzies ministry succeeded the Ninth Menzies ministry, which dissolved on 18 December 1963 following the federal election that took place in November. The ministry was replaced by the First Holt ministry on 26 January 1966 following the retirement of Menzies.

As of 26 January 2023, Ian Sinclair is the last surviving member of the Tenth Menzies ministry; Sinclair is also the last surviving member of the First Holt ministry. James Forbes was the last surviving Liberal minister, and Allen Fairhall and Charles Barnes were the last surviving Liberal and Country Cabinet ministers respectively.

Cabinet

Outer ministry

Notes

Ministries of Elizabeth II
Menzies, 10
1963 establishments in Australia
1966 disestablishments in Australia
Robert Menzies
Cabinets established in 1963
Cabinets disestablished in 1966